"Our House" is a song by British ska and pop band Madness. It was released as the lead single from their fourth studio album, The Rise & Fall, on 12 November 1982. The song charted within the top ten in several countries, and it was the band's biggest hit on the Billboard Hot 100. It won the category Best Pop Song at the May 1983 Ivor Novello Awards.

About
Released in November 1982, it peaked at No. 5 on the UK Singles Chart. "Our House" was their biggest hit in the US, reaching No. 7 on the Billboard Hot 100 in 1983. On the US rock chart, the song peaked at No. 9, and it reached No. 21 on the US dance chart. It received heavy airplay by radio stations.

The B-side, "Walking with Mr. Wheeze", is an instrumental. The title is a play on "Groovin' with Mr. Bloe", a 1970 instrumental hit by the session group Mr. Bloe.

Music video
The band portrays a working-class family in the video, including one with a stubbly face, dressed in an apron and bonnet, playing the mother. The band members perform with their instruments in the living room, as they prepare for work and school. The family play squash and relax in a hot tub. The video includes exterior shots of other houses, such as the Playboy Mansion, Stocks House in Hertfordshire, and Buckingham Palace. The domestic property featured in the video is a terrace house on Stephenson Street in north-west London, near Willesden Junction.

In popular culture

In 1984, Madness made a guest appearance in the series 2 episode "Sick" of The Young Ones, performing "Our House". They had previously appeared in series 1, performing "House of Fun".

A musical called Our House, featuring Madness songs, ran in London's West End between October 2002 and August 2003. A recording of the show was broadcast on BBC Three and was released as a DVD.

In Chile, the song was used in the theme song of Chilean Canal 13 TV series, Papá Mono.

The song has been adapted into an anthem by fans of football club Aston Villa, to refer to centre back Kortney Hause.

The song is used in TV commercials for HyVee. The lyric and verses are slightly modified to match with the commercial's theme.

"Our House" appears in a 2021 TV commercial for Allstate.

"Our House" was featured in a Dead Ringers parody of Jeremy Vine's Radio 2 programme on 9 July 2021.

A reworded version of the song is used in advertising jingles for Australian and New Zealand retail pharmacy chain Chemist Warehouse

Track listing
7" single (Stiff Records - BUY 163)
"Our House" – 3:23
"Walking with Mr. Wheeze" – 3:31

7" single (Stiff Records - BUY JB 163)
"Our House (Special stretch mix)" – 3:45
"Walking with Mr. Wheeze" – 3:31

US 7" single (Geffen Records - 7–29668)
"Our House" - 3:20
"Cardiac Arrest" - 2:58

("Special stretch mix" is a mostly instrumental edit of the extended mix)

12" single (Stiff Records - BUYIT 163)
"Our House" (Extended Mix) – 6:00
"Our House" (7" Version) – 3:23
"Walking with Mr. Wheeze" – 3:31

 U.S. 12" single (Geffen Records - 0–29667)
"Our House (Dance mix)" – 5:02
"Mad House (Our House dub mix)" – 4:35

Charts

Weekly charts

Year-end charts

Certifications and sales

See also
 The Young Ones
 List of number-one singles of 1983 (Canada)
 List of number-one singles and albums in Sweden

References

External links
Music video of "Our House" on YouTube
Classic Tracks: 'Our House' by Madness

Songs about nostalgia
Songs about families
1982 singles
Madness (band) songs
Number-one singles in Sweden
RPM Top Singles number-one singles
Songs written by Chris Foreman
Songs written by Chas Smash
Stiff Records singles
Geffen Records singles
Virgin Records singles
Song recordings produced by Clive Langer
Song recordings produced by Alan Winstanley
1982 songs